The 1955–56 Houston Cougars men's basketball team represented the University of Houston in the 1955–56 season of college basketball. It was their eleventh year of season play. The head coach for the Cougars was Alden Pasche, who was serving in his 11th year in that position.  The team played its home games at Jeppesen Gymnasium on-campus in Houston and were members of the Missouri Valley Conference.  Houston captured its fourth conference regular season title, and competed in the postseason in the 1956 NCAA basketball tournament where they were defeated by SMU and Kansas State. It was Houston's first ever appearance in the NCAA tournament.

After the season, Pasche retired. He was 135–116 in eleven seasons, and was replaced by Guy Lewis.

Roster

Schedule

|-
!colspan=7|Regular season

|-
!colspan=7|NCAA tournament

Rankings

References

Houston Cougars men's basketball seasons
Houston
Houston